Braid is a surname. Notable people with the surname include:

 Daniel Braid (born 1981), New Zealand rugby union footballer 
 David Braid (musician) (born 1975), Canadian jazz pianist and composer
 Hilda Braid (1929–2007), English actress 
 James Braid (golfer) (1870–1950), Scottish professional golfer 
 James Braid (surgeon) (1795–1860), Scottish neurosurgeon and pioneer of hypnotism
 Kate Braid (born 1947), Canadian poet
 Sean Braid (born 1994), Actor

See also
 Braid
 Brady